Nocardia aurantiaca is a species of bacteria from the genus Nocardia that has been isolated from soil in Thailand.

References

Mycobacteriales
Bacteria described in 2022